Bovard may refer to:

Bovard, Butler County, Pennsylvania
Bovard, Westmoreland County, Pennsylvania, an unincorporated community in Westmoreland County
Bovard Field, a stadium in Los Angeles, California

People with the name Bovard
Alan Bovard
George F. Bovard
James Bovard
Marion McKinley Bovard